Alexandros Poursanidis (born 23 January 1993) is a Cypriot hammer thrower.

In age-specific categories he won the silver medal at the 2010 Youth Olympics and finished fourth at the 2012 World Junior Championships, eighth at the 2013 European U23 Championships and twelfth at the 2015 European U23 Championships.

He finished tenth at the 2014 Commonwealth Games, no-marked in the final at the 2017 Universiade and finished fifteenth at the 2018 Commonwealth Games.

Won the European team cup league B in 2019 in Croatia with a mark of 71.06.

His personal best throw is 74.05 meters, achieved in 2021.

References

1993 births
Living people
Cypriot male hammer throwers
Athletes (track and field) at the 2010 Summer Youth Olympics
Athletes (track and field) at the 2014 Commonwealth Games
Athletes (track and field) at the 2018 Commonwealth Games
Athletes (track and field) at the 2022 Commonwealth Games
Commonwealth Games competitors for Cyprus
Competitors at the 2017 Summer Universiade
Athletes (track and field) at the 2022 Mediterranean Games
Mediterranean Games silver medalists for Cyprus
Mediterranean Games medalists in athletics
Commonwealth Games bronze medallists for Cyprus
Commonwealth Games medallists in athletics
Medallists at the 2022 Commonwealth Games